Wilson Airport  is an airport in Nairobi, Kenya. It has flights to many regional airports in Kenya while Nairobi's main airport, Jomo Kenyatta International Airport, serves domestic and many international destinations.

Location
Wilson Airport, is in Nairobi County, in the city of Nairobi, the capital of Kenya and the largest metropolitan centre in that country. Nearby suburbs include Langata, South C, and Kibera.

The coordinates of Wilson airport are:1° 19' 12.00"S, 36° 48' 54.00"E (Latitude:-1.320000; Longitude:36.815000).

Overview
The airport serves domestic and international traffic. It is used mostly by general aviation traffic. Industries that use Wilson Airport extensively include tourism, health care and agriculture. Wilson Airport averages traffic of around 120,000 landings and take-offs annually.

Airkenya and other small airlines use Wilson Airport for scheduled domestic passenger services, instead of Jomo Kenyatta International Airport. Missionary aviation operators AMREF, Mission Aviation Fellowship (MAF) and AIM AIR use Wilson Airport as their airport base on the African continent. It is used also for flight training. The airport is under the supervision of Kenya Airports Authority (KAA).

As a result of faster check-in times and fewer flight delays, as compared to Jomo Kenyatta International Airport, Wilson Airport is commonly used by business executive aircraft for domestic and international travel. Common domestic destinations from Wilson Airport include Kisumu Airport, Mombasa International Airport and Eldoret International Airport.

History
The airport was established as Nairobi West Aerodrome in 1929, by Florence Kerr Wilson, a wealthy widow. Built at a cost of £50,000 (£3.2 million in 2020), Mrs Wilson hired pilot Tom Campbell Black to run the airport. After the outbreak of World War 2 in 1939, the airport, its aircraft fleet and its pilots were taken over by the then colonial government and made a Royal Air Force base until after the war when it continued functioning as a civilian airport. In 1962, it was named Wilson Airport in honour of its founder who died in 1968.

Airlines and destinations

Accidents and incidents
On 24 December 1968, Douglas C-47A 5Y-ADI of the Kenya Police Air Wing crashed shortly after takeoff - the incident was deemed caused by inadequately secured cargo. All three people on board were killed.
 On 11 October 2019, a Silverstone Air Services Fokker 50  registration 5Y-IZO operating flight 620 to Mombasa, Kenya overran the runway on takeoff from Wilson. The aircraft was extensively damaged but there were no fatalities.

See also

 Kenya Airports Authority
 Kenya Civil Aviation Authority
 List of airports in Kenya

References

External links

Location of Nairobi Wilson Airport at Google Maps
Kenya Airports Authority: Wilson Airport
Wilson Airport live webcam
Flight Training Centre, Wilson Airport, Nairobi: 'Soar Like Eagle'
Wilson Airport live webcam (Yellow Wings)
Aero Club of East Africa
Dying wilson

Airports in Kenya
Illegal housing
Transport in Nairobi